Dryopteris filix-mas, the male fern, is a common fern of the temperate Northern Hemisphere, native to much of Europe, Asia, and North America. It favours damp shaded areas in the understory of woodlands, but also shady places on hedge-banks, rocks, and screes. Near the northern limit of its distribution it prefers sunny, well-drained sites. It is much less abundant in North America than in Europe. The plant is sometimes referred to in ancient literature as worm fern, reflecting its former use against tapeworm.

Its specific epithet filix-mas means "male fern" (filix "fern", mas "male"), as the plant was thought to be the male version of the common lady fern Athyrium filix-femina. being robust in appearance and vigorous in growth.

Description

The bipinnate leaves consist of 20–35 pinnae on each side of the rachis. The leaves taper at both ends, with the basal pinnae about half the length of the middle pinnae. The pinules are rather blunt and equally lobed all around. The stalks are covered with orange-brown scales. On the abaxial surface of the mature blade 5 to 6 sori develop in two rows. When the spores ripen in August to November, the indusium starts to shrivel, leading to the release of the spores.

This species hybridises easily with Dryopteris affinis (scaly male fern) and Dryopteris oreades (mountain male fern).

Cultivation and uses
Numerous cultivars have been selected for garden use. The following have gained the Royal Horticultural Society's Award of Garden Merit: 
D. filix-mas 
'Crispa Cristata'
'Cristata' 
'Grandiceps Wills'
'Linearis Polydactyla'

Culture
D. filix-mas is culturally named the title plant of Nurmijärvi, the municipality in Uusimaa, Finland. The reason is that the plant is related to the first Finnish pharmaceutical factory located in Nurmijärvi in 1899-1964. The pharmaceutical factory founded by the pharmacist Albin Koponen made Diphyllobothrium latum and cestoda medicines called Filisin and Filicon, the raw material of which was the rhizome of D. filix-mas. The rhizomes were still collected in the locality in the 1960s.

References

External links

Flora Europaea: Dryopteris filix-mas
Flora of North America: Dryopteris filix-mas
Jepson Manual Treatment

filix-mas
Ferns of Asia
Ferns of the Americas
Ferns of Europe
Flora of Northeast Asia
Flora of Canada
Flora of Ontario
Ferns of the United States
Ferns of California
Flora of the Western United States
Flora of England
Flora of Estonia
Flora of Finland
Flora of Sweden
Plants described in 1753
Taxa named by Carl Linnaeus